Jerwan is a locality north of Mosul in the Nineveh Province of Iraq. The site is clear of vegetation and is sparsely settled.

The site is famous for the ruins of an enormous aqueduct crossing the Khenis River, constructed of more than two million dressed stones and using stone arches and waterproof cement. Some consider it to be the world's oldest aqueduct, predating anything the Romans built by five centuries.

The Aqueduct of Jerwan

The aqueduct is part of the larger Atrush Canal built by the Assyrian king Sennacherib between 703 and 690 BC to water Ninevah's extensive gardens, with water diverted from Khenis gorge, 50 km to the north.

An inscription on the aqueduct reads:
"Sennacherib king of the world king of Assyria. Over a great distance I had a watercourse directed to the environs of Nineveh, joining together the waters.... Over steep-sided valleys I spanned an aqueduct of white limestone blocks, I made those waters flow over it."
 
Some scholars believe the legends of the Hanging Gardens of Babylon were actually Sennacherib’s extensive gardens in Nineveh, not Babylon.

Further reading
 Documents from Jerwan by The University of Chicago
 Reconstruction of the Jerwan Aqueduct
 Richard David Barnett, Sculptures from the north palace of Ashurbanipal at Nineveh (668-627 B.C.), British Museum Publications Ltd, 1976

References

Infrastructure completed in the 7th century BC
Archaeological sites in Iraq
Neo-Assyrian Empire
Sennacherib
Aqueducts
Hanging Gardens of Babylon